Taungbyu is a village in Mingin Township, Kale District, in the Sagaing Region of western Burma. It is located on the Chindwin River, east of Kywegya.

References

External links
Maplandia World Gazetteer

Populated places in Kale District
Mingin Township